William C. Jordan (born October 13, 1937) is an American film and television actor. He played Major Jake Gatlin in season one of the television series Project UFO, among other roles in films and television series.

Personal life
 
Jordan was born in Milan, Indiana. As a high school student, under the name Bill Jordan, Jordan was a member of the famous 1954 Milan High School basketball team that won the 1954 Indiana High School Athletic Association (IHSAA) State Tournament. It was this 1954 Milan "Indians" basketball team on which the movie Hoosiers was loosely based. Jordan is a graduate of Indiana University.

During his career as an actor, Jordan rented an upscale apartment in Hollywood, while owning a large home in Arrowhead, California.

Filmography

Film
 Nothing But a Man (1964) - Teenager
 To Catch a Pebble (1970)
 A Man Called Horse (1970) - Bent
 Deathmaster (1972) - Monk
 Rage (1972) - Major Cooper
 Blue Demon y Zovek en La invasión de los muertos (1973)
 The Parallax View (1974) - Tucker's Aide
 The Private Files of J. Edgar Hoover (1977) - President John F. Kennedy
 Gray Lady Down (1978) - Waters
 The Buddy Holly Story (1978) - Riley
 Hambone and Hillie (1983) - Bert Rollins
 Kingpin (1996) - Mr. Boorg
 Contact (1997) - Chairman of Joint Chiefs
 Brooklyn Lobster (2005) - John Evans
 Terra Firma (short film) (2008) - Barman

Television
 Flipper (1966) - Eric Tilton / Mr. Enfield (two episodes)
 The Rat Patrol (1967) - Major Heinrich Bruder (one episode)
 Judd, for the Defense (1968) - Wagner (one episode)
 The High Chaparral (1968) - Pearsall (one episode)
 The Big Valley (1968) - Dave Carr (one episode)
 Bonanza (1967, 1969) - Mr. Leek / Rusher (two episodes)
 Mannix (1972) (one episode)
 The Sixth Sense (1972) - John (one episode)
 Call to Danger (TV movie) (1973) - Tony Boyd
 Griff (1973) - Johnny Barton (one episode)
 The Magician (1973) - Sheriff R. Sanders (one episode)
 The New Adventures of Perry Mason (1974) (one episode)
 The Streets of San Francisco (1973–1974) - Bob Harris (two episodes)
 The Kansas City Massacre (TV movie) (1975) - John Dillinger
 Cannon (1975) - Holt (one episode)
 Barbary Coast (1975) - James Carr (one episode)
 Hallmark Hall of Fame (1976) - Kenneth Ormiston (one episode)
 The Rockford Files (1974–1977) - Jeffers / Police Officer Andrew Dolan / Terry Warde (three episodes)
 Lucan (1977) - Gene Boone (one episode)
 The Trial of Lee Harvey Oswald (TV movie) (1977) - James Kleist
 King (TV mini-series) (1978) - John F. Kennedy
 Project UFO (1978) - Major Jake Gatlin
 Friendly Fire (TV movie) (1979) - Col. Byron Schindler
 Beyond Westworld (1980) - Joseph Oppenheimer
 Secrets of Midland Heights (1981) - Martin Wheeler (one episode)
 Lou Grant (1980, 1982) - Danzinger / Pomeroy (two episodes)
 Simon & Simon (1983) - Dean Larkin (one episode)
 The Yellow Rose (1984) - The Foreman (one episode)
 Lottery! (1984) (one episode)
 Scarecrow and Mrs. King (1984) - Masterson (one episode)
 Knight Rider (1986) - Dr. Ian Browning (one episode)
 Beverly Hills Madam (TV movie) (1986) - Len Culver
 T. J. Hooker (1986) - Bill Kennedy (one episode)
 Guns of Paradise (1989) - Curtis Ivey (one episode)
 L.A. Law (1990) Mark Johnson (one episode)
 Knots Landing (1990) - Attorney (one episode)
 Mission of the Shark: The Saga of the U.S.S. Indianapolis (TV movie) (1991) - Hathaway
 Silk Stalkings (1993) - Fletcher Stanton (one episode)
 Walker, Texas Ranger (1997) - Jackson Blake Dupree (one episode)
 Mowgli: The New Adventures of the Jungle Book (1998) - Packwood (one episode)

References

External links
 
 

1937 births
Living people
Male actors from Indiana
American male film actors
American male television actors